Theron Cooper (born 18 January 1974) is a Bahamian sprinter. He competed in the men's 4 × 400 metres relay at the 1996 Summer Olympics.

References

External links
 

1974 births
Living people
Athletes (track and field) at the 1996 Summer Olympics
Bahamian male sprinters
Olympic athletes of the Bahamas
Place of birth missing (living people)